Allen Perry Lovejoy was a Wisconsin politician, lumber merchant and manufacturer, and generally influential business leader from Janesville, Wisconsin.

Biography
Lovejoy was born Allen Perry Lovejoy on March 20, 1825, in Wayne, Maine, and raised on the family farm.  He attended Wesleyan Seminary, now Kents Hill School, and for a year at the age of eighteen he taught school.  In 1844 he took up an apprenticeship in the carpenter and building trade, and in 1850 he moved to Janesville, eventually expanding his contractor business into lumber retailing and manufacturing, with extensive raw timber holdings in Wisconsin and Michigan.  Among the business leadership positions he held were president of the Harris Manufacturing Company, vice-president of the Janesville Machine Company, president of the New McLean Manufacturing Company, director of the First National Bank, director of the State Lumber Company, and vice-president of the Merrill Lumber Company.

On May 29, 1880, he married Julia Stow of New Haven, Connecticut.  They had four children: Allen, Henry, Julia and Webster (who died as an infant).  Julia Lovejoy was a well-known citizen of Janesville and lived to 103.  She founded the first kindergarten in Janesville, helped found the city's first hospital, and was active in the movement for women's suffrage.  Allen Lovejoy was the second cousin of Owen Lovejoy and Elijah Parish Lovejoy, the famous abolitionists from Illinois.  They shared the same great-grandfather, Hezekiah Lovejoy.

His former home, now part of what are known as the Lovejoy and Merrill-Nowlan Houses, is listed on the National Register of Historic Places.

Political career
Lovejoy was a Republican.  He served in the Wisconsin State Assembly in 1879.  In 1881 he was elected mayor of Janesville.  From 1887-1890, he served in the Wisconsin State Senate.

References

Attributions
 
 
 
 

People from Wayne, Maine
Politicians from Janesville, Wisconsin
Wisconsin state senators
Members of the Wisconsin State Assembly
Mayors of places in Wisconsin
Businesspeople from Wisconsin
1825 births
1904 deaths
19th-century American politicians
19th-century American businesspeople